The 1930 North Dakota gubernatorial election was held on November 4, 1930. Incumbent Republican George F. Shafer defeated Democratic nominee Pierce Blewett with 73.62% of the vote.

Primary elections
Primary elections were held on June 25, 1930.

Democratic primary

Candidates
Pierce Blewett, Mayor of Jamestown
Frank O. Hellstrom, North Dakota State Penitentiary Warden
Fred L. Anderson

Results

Republican primary

Candidates
George F. Shafer, incumbent Governor
Everett H. Brant, State Senator

Results

General election

Candidates
Major party candidates
George F. Shafer, Republican
Pierce Blewett, Democratic

Other candidates
Pat J. Barrett, Communist

Results

References

1930
North Dakota
Gubernatorial